The Dutch cutter Kemphaan, meaning "game cock", was launched in 1781 as a 12-gun advice boat, with a mission of carrying dispatches between the Netherlands and its colonies. The Dutch increased her length by almost a quarter in 1787, gave her six more guns, and made a brig-sloop out of her. The British captured her in 1799 when they captured Suriname. She then served briefly in the Royal Navy as HMS Camphaan before she was broken up in early 1802.

Dutch service and capture
There are accounts of Kemphaans service in the 1780s (in Dutch). In August 1781 she was at the battle of Dogger Bank.

In 1782 she was under the command of Lieutenant Johannes Janse Eye (Jean Jantzen Eye). In 1787 the Dutch extended Kemphaan and converted her to a brig-sloop. Between October 1793 and 31 August 1794, Captain Frans Smeer escorted a convoy of merchantmen to the West Indies.

On 20 August 1799, a British force under the command of Lieutenant-General Thomas Trigge and Vice Admiral the Right Honourable Lord Hugh Seymour captured the Dutch colony of Suriname. Among the various items of booty was the Dutch brig-sloop Kemphaan and the French corvette Hussard. Kemphaan was under the command of Kaptain P. Smeer, and was described as having an armament of sixteen 6-pounder guns.

Fate
Camphaan was sold in April 1802 for breaking up.

Notes

Citations

References
 
 
  Unpublished manuscript

External links
For a map of Kemphaans voyages in 1781-86, 1793–94, and 1799 see: 

1781 ships
Ships built in Rotterdam
Brig-sloops of the Royal Navy
Captured ships